The 2012 Nicholls State Colonels football team represented Nicholls State University as a member of the Southland Conference during the 2012 NCAA Division I FCS football season. Led by third-year head coach Charlie Stubbs, the Colonels compiled an overall record of 1–10 with a mark of 0–7 in conference play, placing last out of six teams in the Southland. Nicholls State played home games at John L. Guidry Stadium in Thibodaux, Louisiana.

Schedule

Game summaries

South Alabama

Sources:

Tulsa

Sources:

Evangel

Sources:

Central Arkansas

Sources:

Sam Houston State

Sources:

Stephen F. Austin

Sources:

Northwestern State

Sources:

McNeese State

Sources:

Lamar

Sources:

Southeastern Louisiana

Sources:

Oregon State
 
The 2012 season was scheduled to begin with Oregon State playing the Colonels. It was to be the first meeting between the two programs. However, Hurricane Isaac changed this. Since the Colonels hadn't practiced together since August 25 and the campus didn't reopen until September 3, the game was postponed. A December 1 make-up date occurred, when Nicholls State did not make the playoffs.

Sources:

Media
Nicholls State football games were be broadcast live on the radio through KLRZ 100.3 FM, KLEB AM 1600, and KBZE 105.9 FM. KLRZ and KLEB also streamed the games online.

References

Nicholls State
Nicholls Colonels football seasons
Nicholls State Colonels football